Scidrus, also known as Skidros, was an ancient Greek city on the coast of Lucania, on the Tyrrhenian Sea, between Pyxus (Buxentum) and Laüs.

History
It is mentioned only by Herodotus (vi. 21), from whom we learn that it was, as well as Laüs, a colony of Sybaris, and was one of the places to which the surviving inhabitants of that city retired, after its destruction by the Crotoniats. It does not appear from his expressions whether these towns were then first founded by the fugitives, or had been previously settled as regular colonies; but the latter supposition is much the more probable. It is singular that no subsequent trace is found of Scidrus; its name is never again mentioned in history, nor alluded to by the geographers, with the exception of Stephanus of Byzantium (s. v.), who calls it merely a city of Italy. We have therefore no clue to its position; for even its situation on the Tyrrhenian Sea is a mere inference from the manner in which it is mentioned by Herodotus in conjunction with Laüs. They are said to consist of the remains of a theatre and other public buildings of the ancient walls, and constructions around the port. (Antonini, Lucania, part ii. c. 11; Romanelli, vol. i. p. 377.) This last is a remarkable landlocked basin, though of small extent; and it is singular that, even if the town had ceased to exist, no allusion should be found to the existence of this secure port, on a coast almost wholly destitute of natural harbours. But the high mountains which shut it in and debar it from all communication with the interior probably prevented it from ever attaining any importance. Sapri is at the present day a mere fishing village, about 10 km east of Policastro.

See also
List of ancient Greek cities

References

Colonies of Magna Graecia
Former populated places in Italy